Mark Bomersback (born July 8, 1982) is a Canadian former professional ice hockey player.

As an amateur player Bomersback set the all-time scoring record in the Alberta Junior Hockey League (AJHL) completing his AJHL career tallying 396 points in 250 games.

Playing career
An Alberta born hockey player that set an all-time scoring record in the Alberta Junior Hockey League (AJHL) completing his AJHL career tallying 396 points in 250 games.

In the 2002-2003 AJHL season Mark posted 114 points in 64 games to lead the Canmore Eagles in scoring and was named the RBC Financial Group Canadian Junior “A” (CJAHL) Player Of The Year. He played the 2009–10 season in the HC Plzeň 1929 in the Czech Extraliga. He was named the best newcomer of Czech Extraliga in the 2009–10.

References

External links

AJHL Website

1982 births
Living people
Binghamton Senators players
Canadian ice hockey left wingers
Canmore Eagles players
Ferris State Bulldogs men's ice hockey players
Ice hockey people from Alberta
Idaho Steelheads (ECHL) players
Iowa Stars players
Lukko players
Metallurg Novokuznetsk players
Piráti Chomutov players
HC Plzeň players
Providence Bruins players
SCL Tigers players
Syracuse Crunch players
Canadian expatriate ice hockey players in the Czech Republic
Canadian expatriate ice hockey players in the United States
Canadian expatriate ice hockey players in Russia
Canadian expatriate ice hockey players in Finland
Canadian expatriate ice hockey players in Switzerland